The Trail of the Law is a 1924 American silent film directed by Oscar Apfel and starring Wilfred Lytell,  Norma Shearer and John P. Morse.

Cast
 Wilfred Lytell 
 Norma Shearer as Jerry Vardon  
John P. Morse
 George Stevens 
 Richard Neill
 Charles Byer

References

Bibliography
 Jack Jacobs & Myron Braum. The films of Norma Shearer. A. S. Barnes, 1976.

External links

1924 films
Films directed by Oscar Apfel
American silent feature films
American black-and-white films
1920s English-language films
1920s American films